John Hassall may refer to:

John Hassall (musician) (born 1981), English bassist
John Hassall (illustrator) (1868–1948), English poster artist
John Hassall, chairman of Sheffield United F.C., an English football club

See also
Jon Hassall (born 1973), Australian rules footballer
John Hassell (disambiguation)